Yves Tronc (born 30 June 1960) is a French sport shooter who specializes in the trap.

At the 2008 Olympic Games he finished in joint thirteenth place in the trap qualification, missing a place among the top six, who progressed to the final round. He also competed at the 2004 Olympic Games.

References

External links

1960 births
Living people
French male sport shooters
Shooters at the 2004 Summer Olympics
Shooters at the 2008 Summer Olympics
Olympic shooters of France
Trap and double trap shooters
21st-century French people